Isaac Grout Bliss (Springfield, Massachusetts, 1822–1889) was a missionary and agent of the American Bible Society (ABS) in the Near East. He made the first of the Bible translations into Kurdish. He was educated at Amherst College and at Andover.

References

1822 births
1889 deaths
People from Springfield, Massachusetts
Translators of the Bible into Kurdish
American Protestant missionaries
19th-century American translators
Protestant missionaries in India
American expatriates in India
Missionary linguists